Owen B. Thomas is a former Welsh professional darts player who competed in the 1980s.

Career
Thomas played in the 1984 BDO World Darts Championship, losing in the first round to Gerry Haywood.

He also played in the 1983 Winmau World Masters and the 1984 British Professional, losing in the first round in both tournaments to Keith Deller and Eric Burden.

World Championship Results

BDO
 1984: Last 32: (lost to Gerry Haywood 0–2)

External links
Profile and stats on Darts Database

Living people
Welsh darts players
British Darts Organisation players
1953 births